Salvia camarifolia is a perennial undershrub native to the northern and eastern slopes of the Sierra Nevada de Santa Marta in Colombia, growing at elevations from . There is also past evidence of a specimen from the Ocaña region.

Notes

camarifolia
Flora of Colombia